Barno is a surname. Notable people with the surname include:

Amaré Barno (born 1999), American football player
David Barno (born 1954), American lieutenant general
Elisha Barno (born 1985), Kenyan marathon runner
Esther Barno (born 1968), Kenyan volleyball player